Franzensburg is a medieval style castle in Laxenburg, Lower Austria, Austria.

Built between 1801 and 1836, it was named in memory of the last Holy Roman Emperor, Francis II, who died in 1835.

Views of the Castle

See also
List of castles in Austria

References
This article was initially translated from the German Wikipedia.

External links
 Schloss Laxenburg - information on the Laxenburg castles including Franzensburg

Castles in Lower Austria
Museums in Lower Austria
Historic house museums in Austria